Hughes v Metropolitan Railway Co [1877] is a House of Lords case considered unremarkable for many years until it was resurrected by Lord Denning in the case of Central London Property Trust Ltd v High Trees House Ltd in his development of the doctrine of promissory estoppel.  The case was the first known instance of the concept of promissory estoppel.

Facts
Thomas Hughes owned property leased to the Railway Company at 216 Euston Road.  Under the lease, Hughes was entitled to compel the tenant to repair the building within six months of notice.  Notice  was given on 22 October 1874 from which the tenants had until 22 April to finish the repairs.  On 28 November, the tenant railway company sent a letter proposing that Hughes purchase the tenant's leasehold interest.  Negotiations began but later broke down, at which point the landlord demanded the repair of the building from 6 months since the original notice. The tenant claimed he should have had 6 months from the time the negotiations broke down, based on promissory estoppel.

Judgment

Court of Common Pleas
The Court of Common Pleas held in favour of the landlord, Mr Hughes.  Metropolitan appealed.  Lord Coleridge CJ delivered the leading judgment, with which Brett J and Lindley J concurred.

Court of Appeal
The Court of Appeal (1875–76) LR 1 CPD 120 reversed the decision of Court of Common Pleas. James LJ, Mellish LJ, Baggallay JA, Mellor J, and Cleasby B gave judgments.

House of Lords
The House of Lords affirmed the Court of Appeal. It ruled that with the initiation of the negotiations there was an implied promise by the landlord not to enforce their strict legal rights with respect to the time limit on the repairs, and the tenant acted on this promise to their detriment.
Lord Cairns LC gave the lead judgment, with which Lords O'Hagan, Selborne, Blackburn and Gordon concurred.

In this instance the rights of the landlord were suspended only temporarily, allowing the tenant more time to repair.

See also 
 Consideration in English law

References

External links 
UKHL 1 

House of Lords cases
1877 in case law
Lord Blackburn cases
English enforceability case law
English estoppel case law
1877 in British law
Railway litigation in 1877